Altenkirchen is a former Verbandsgemeinde ("collective municipality") in the district of Altenkirchen, in Rhineland-Palatinate, Germany. The seat of the Verbandsgemeinde was in Altenkirchen. On 1 January 2020 it was merged into the new Verbandsgemeinde Altenkirchen-Flammersfeld. It lies within the region of the Westerwald known as Kroppach Switzerland.

The Verbandsgemeinde Altenkirchen consisted of the following Ortsgemeinden ("local municipalities"):

* seat of the Verbandsgemeinde

References

Former Verbandsgemeinden in Rhineland-Palatinate